Paul Bell may refer to:

 Paul Bell (politician) (1950–2010), Iowa State Representative from the 41st District
 Paul Bell (footballer) (1914–1945), Australian rules footballer
 Paul Bell (baseball) (born 1980), South African baseball infielder
 Paul Bell (rugby league) (born 1969), rugby league footballer of the 1990s and 2000s
 Paul Bell, a pseudonym used by English author Henry Fothergill Chorley  (1808–1872)